Curt T. Schneider (born October 12, 1943) is an American politician who served as the Attorney General of Kansas from 1975 to 1979.

References

1943 births
Living people
Kansas Attorneys General
Kansas Democrats